The FA People's Cup is an annual English association football tournament organised by The Football Association. The first installment of the tournament, ran in partnership with the British Broadcasting Corporation's "Get Inspired" campaign took place in 2015.

The tournament is open to any football player over the age of 16 and is technically made up of 15 separate tournaments with 15 finals. Categories include male, female, disability (separate tournaments for men and women) and futsal. The finals are played at St George's Park National Football Centre near Burton-on-Trent. The winners of each cup get tickets to that season's FA Cup Final.

Winners

References

External links

Football cup competitions in England
Recurring sporting events established in 2015